Patia cordillera is a butterfly in the family Pieridae. It is found from Costa Rica to Colombia and Ecuador.

Subspecies
The following subspecies are recognised:
P. c. cordillera (Colombia)
P. c. larunda (Hewitson, 1869) (Ecuador)
P. c. sororna (Butler, 1872) (Costa Rica, Panama)
P. c. thecla (Bargmann, 1929) (Colombia)

Gallery

References

Dismorphiinae
Butterflies described in 1862
Pieridae of South America
Taxa named by Baron Cajetan von Felder
Taxa named by Rudolf Felder